WRGW is the student-run radio station of The George Washington University.  It broadcasts live every day online throughout the school year between 8am and 2am. The studio is in the ground floor of the University Student Center, where it has been located since 1999.

History
While now only available on the internet, the online broadcasts are named for a carrier current radio station that first operated on campus in 1958. That station was created as a result of efforts by GWU's Radio Club, which was founded in February 1929. Carrier current stations have coverage generally limited to a single location, such as a university campus, and operate with such low powers that they do not require a Federal Communications Commission (FCC) license. The station adopted the self-assigned call letters of WRGW, and operated on various frequencies, including AM 660, and later on AM 540. With the exception of a period between 1984 and 1986, WRGW has operated continuously since its founding, and currently at http://www.gwradio.com.

In 2013, WRGW received the Pyramid Award for Student Organization of the Year.

WRTV-AM 600 
WRTV-AM 600 was a radio station at the George Washington University from the mid eighties until the late 1990s when it merged with WRGW. Unlike WRGW, which was entirely student operated, WRTV was a branch of the university's communications department. Academic advisors to the station included Professor Joan Thiel, Professor Gregory Lowe, and NPR's, Corey Flintoff.

The station's main purpose was to train students in broadcast journalism. It placed a heavy emphasis on news related to campus and the larger DC area. WRTV featured several music shows, sports talk programs, entertainment shows, as well as a nightly news broadcast. WRTV also covered campus home of games of the George Washington University Colonials basketball team.

Programming
WRGW District Radio offers more than 100 distinct programs across four different departments - music, talk, news, and sports.

Music
The music department is the largest department of the station, and a large variety of music types are reflected in the many different weekly music shows. Music shows sometimes include on-air interviews and live performances. The department hosts numerous events throughout the year and DJs for many university events.

Talk
The talk department includes a wide variety of shows, with almost no topic off limits.

News
WRGW News is broadcast from 6pm to 6:30pm on weekdays, and covers campus and local stories as well as national and international news. Members of the news department write stories and conduct original reporting on campus and local news. The news department website features these student written articles as well as recordings of all news broadcasts.

Sports
The sports department covers many GW athletic events, including every GW Colonials women's and men's basketball game. Sports analysis of campus and national sports is broadcast from 4pm to 6pm on weekdays.

References

External links
WRGW official website
Listen Live to WRGW
WRGW News
WRGW Sports
The WRGW Music Blog

College radio stations in Washington, D.C.
George Washington University
Radio stations established in 1958
Defunct radio stations in the United States
1958 establishments in Washington, D.C.
Internet radio stations in the United States